P. alpinus may refer to:
 Phyllocladus alpinus, a conifer species found only in New Zealand
 Potamogeton alpinus, the alpine pondweed or red pondweed, an aquatic plant species native to much of the Northern Hemisphere

See also 
 Alpinus (disambiguation)